Hermetic Press was a publishing company in Seattle, specializing in technical literature on magic and mentalism. The company was founded in 1990 by Stephen Minch who "after writing books on magic for seventeen years, decided to try publishing them as well." The company specialized in high quality books and often produces limited edition volumes with fine binding.

In addition to the technical publications, the company has also published magic historical and biographical books, including a translation of J. Prevost's "Clever and Pleasant Inventions", from 1584, a biography on Lulu Hearst, the "magnetic girl" who became a star in the 19th century, and the autobiography of Milo & Roger

Among the company's publications are works by Alex Elmsley, Max Maven, Tommy Wonder and Juan Tamariz.

In 2016, Hermetic Press merged with Penguin Magic, which now publishes books under the Hermetic Press imprint.

References

External links
Hermetic Press

Magic publications